The 1996 Great American Insurance ATP Championships was a tennis tournament played on outdoor clay courts. It was the 95th edition of the Cincinnati Masters and was part of the Mercedes Super 9 of the 1996 ATP Tour. It took place at the Lindner Family Tennis Center in Mason, Ohio in the United States from August 5 through August 11, 1996.

The tournament had previously appeared as part of Tier III of the WTA Tour but no event was held from 1989 to 2003.

Finals

Singles

 Andre Agassi defeated  Michael Chang 7–6(7–4), 6–4
 It was Agassi's 3rd title of the year and the 35th of his career. It was his 2nd Masters title of the year and his 9th overall. It was also his 2nd title at the event after winning in 1995.

Doubles

 Mark Knowles /  Daniel Nestor defeated  Sandon Stolle /  Cyril Suk 3–6, 6–3, 6–4
 It was Knowles' 5th title of the year and the 9th of his career. It was Nestor's 4th title of the year and the 6th of his career.

References

External links
 
 Association of Tennis Professionals (ATP) tournament profile

 
Great American Insurance ATP Championships
Cincinnati Masters
Great American Insurance ATP Championships
Great American